Marijan Marković (October 20, 1840 – June 20, 1912) was Bosnian Croat Franciscan friar of the Franciscan Province of Bosna Srebrena, bishop and apostolic administrator of Banja Luka.

Biography 
Marković was born at Dolac, near Travnik in Central Bosnia. In April 1856 he entered in Franciscan monastery in Fojnica and year later he became Franciscan friar. In Đakovo Marković studied and graduated in philosophy and theology.

He was ordained a priest on April 26, 1863.

Episcopal career 
On March 27, 1884 he was appointed apostolic administrator of Banja Luka and Titular Bishop of Danaba. He received his episcopal consecration from Serafino Vannutelli, in Vienna on May 4, 1884. One month later he came to Banja Luka and in July 1884 he ordered the construction of the cathedral and the bishop's palace. The bishop did a great job for the Catholic Church in the Diocese of Banja Luka in the next ten years. From 1893 to 1903 nine churches and five chapels was built and number of Catholics increased from 36, 000 to 73, 200. During his ministry he founded 13 new parishes: Bosanska Kostajnica, Bosanski Novi, Mahovljani, Prijedor, Prnjavor, Ključ, Zelinovac (Krnjeuša), Novi Martinac, Miljevac, Rakovac, Devetina, Stara Dubrava and Bosanski Petrovac.

He died in Banja Luka on June 20, 1912.

References 

1840 births
1912 deaths
People from Travnik
Croats of Bosnia and Herzegovina
Franciscans of the Franciscan Province of Bosnia
Bishops of Banja Luka
Franciscan bishops
19th-century Roman Catholic titular bishops
Bishops appointed by Pope Leo XIII
Bosnia and Herzegovina Roman Catholic bishops
19th-century Roman Catholic bishops in Bosnia and Herzegovina
20th-century Roman Catholic bishops in Bosnia and Herzegovina